Payload is the carrying capacity of a vehicle, often an aircraft or spacecraft.

Payload may also refer to:
 Payload (computing), several analogous usages
 a game mode in Team Fortress 2 and other first-person shooters, in which the attacking team must push a bomb to the defending base
 Payload (EP), an EP by Hunters & Collectors
 Payload (G.I. Joe), several versions of a character or its toy from the G.I. Joe franchise
 Payload (Transformers), several incarnations of a character or its toy from the Transformers robot superhero franchise

See also
 Cargo, goods being transported